Serghine is a town and commune in Tiaret Province in north-western Algeria.

References

Communes of Tiaret Province